Statistics of Swiss Super League in the 1920–21 season.

East

Table

Results

Central

Table

Results

West

Table

Results

Final

Table

Results 

|colspan="3" style="background-color:#D0D0D0" align=center|17 April 1921

|-
|colspan="3" style="background-color:#D0D0D0" align=center|24 April 1921

|-
|colspan="3" style="background-color:#D0D0D0" align=center|8 May 1921

Grasshopper Club Zürich won the championship.

Sources 
 Switzerland 1920-21 at RSSSF

Seasons in Swiss football
Swiss Football League seasons 
1920–21 in Swiss football
Swiss